Lonnie Farmer (March 28, 1940 – February 24, 2016) was an American football linebacker. He played for the Boston Patriots from 1964 to 1966.

He died on February 24, 2016, in Chattanooga, Tennessee, at age 75.

References

1940 births
2016 deaths
American football linebackers
Northwestern Wildcats football players
Chattanooga Mocs football players
Boston Patriots players